Jazz Track is a compilation album by Miles Davis, released in November 1959 by Columbia Records, catalogue CL 1268. It compiles sessions by the most recent edition of the Davis Sextet which were insufficient to compose an entire LP, with music previously released in France as a soundtrack. This album was made available on CD for the first time as part of Miles Davis' 'The Original Mono Recordings' box set.

Content
Side one is the American issue of material recorded on December 4, 1957, for the soundtrack of the 1958 Louis Malle film Ascenseur pour l'échafaud, and previously released in Europe as a 10 inch LP  on the Fontana label. The soundtrack was recorded in Paris, December 4, 1957, using local musicians, including American expatriate drummer Kenny Clarke.

Side two consists of newly released material recorded by his sextet on May 26, 1958. These were the same musicians who would soon record Kind of Blue, excluding pianist Wynton Kelly. The composition "Fran Dance" is named for Davis' wife, Frances Taylor.
 
The complete Fontana soundtrack was issued on compact disc in the 1980s, using the original title and Fontana artwork, expanded with all studio takes from the session. The sextet material was later rereleased in 1974 under the title 1958 Miles, with live recordings from the same year replacing the soundtrack material. This album, and not Jazz Track, survived into the compact disc era. The sextet material, with additional tracks, appeared again in 2008 as part of the Kind of Blue 40th Anniversary Edition on Legacy Records.

Track listing
All tracks written by Miles Davis except as indicated.

Side one

Side two

Personnel

Side one
 Miles Davis – trumpet
 Barney Wilen – tenor saxophone
 René Urtreger – piano
 Pierre Michelot – double bass
 Kenny Clarke – drums

Side two
 Miles Davis – trumpet
 Julian "Cannonball" Adderley – alto saxophone
 John Coltrane – tenor saxophone
 Bill Evans – piano
 Paul Chambers – bass
 Jimmy Cobb – drums

References

1959 compilation albums
Miles Davis albums
Columbia Records albums
Albums produced by Teo Macero